Bactra venosana, the nutgrass borer or nutsedge borer, is a moth of the family Tortricidae. It was first described by Philipp Christoph Zeller in 1847. Julius von Kennel provides a full description. 
It has a wide distribution, from southern Europe, North Africa and Asia Minor to India, Sri Lanka, southern China, Malaya, Australia and into the Pacific where it is found on Java, Borneo, the Philippines, Taiwan, Timor, the Solomons, the Carolines and Fiji. It was introduced to Hawaii in 1925 to control nutsedge. It is now found on Kauai, Oahu, Molokai, Maui, Lanai and Hawaii.

Biology
The larvae feed on Cyperus rotundus and Kyllinga species, including Kyllinga brevifolia and Kyllinga monocephala. They bore the stem of their host plant.

Affected plants first show a withering of the inner leaves, which become yellow and finally die. Early instars are pale, glassy yellowish, with a shining black head. Full-grown caterpillars are green or pale yellowish. They spin a tube of silk in the stem and in this cocoon sheds its skin to turn into a pupa of about 5–7 mm long. Adults have grayish forewings with complex brown markings. Hindwings plain grayish.

Control
Mechanical methods such as hand picking of adults and caterpillars are effective. Pheromone traps and light traps are also effective. Eggs can be destroyed biologically by using the egg parasitoid Trichogrammatoidea bactrae.

References

External links

Species info

Bactrini
Lepidoptera used as pest control agents
Insects of Timor
Moths of Japan
Tortricidae of Europe
Moths described in 1847
Moths of Africa